Phacus is a genus of unicellular excavates, of the phylum Euglenozoa (also known as Euglenophyta), characterized by its flat, leaf-shaped structure, and rigid cytoskeleton known as a pellicle. These eukaryotes are mostly green in colour, and have a single flagellum that extends the length of their body. They are morphologically very flat, rigid, leaf-shaped, and contain many small discoid chloroplasts.

Phacus are commonly found in freshwater habitats around the globe and include several hundred species that continue to be discovered to this day. Currently, there are 564 species of Phacus in the database, but only 171 have been accepted taxonomically. The genus was established in 1841 and since then major discoveries have led it to become an extremely large group containing hundreds of species with varied physiological characteristics. Contemporary studies agree that Phacus is not monophyletic or holophyletic, but is actually polyphyletic. Unfortunately, the phylogenetic relationships within the genus are currently poorly understood.

Etymology 

The genus name is believed to have originated from the Greek word Phakos, meaning lentil or lens. This may be due to the general round or oval shape of the many species that are part of this genus. Its origins date back to the nineteenth century, in France, where it first received publication and establishment by Dujardin. The genus name is currently treated in literature as masculine.

History of knowledge 
The genus was first established by the French biologist Felix Dujardin in 1841. Dujardin first published collective findings of the genus in the scientific journal Histoire naturelle des Zoophytes, Infusoires in 1841, separating them from the genus Euglena. The reason behind the separation was in order to create a group that correctly organizes their established morphological characteristics such as their rigid, flat, leaf-shape and small discoid chloroplasts with absent pyrenoids.

Christian Ehrenberg was one of the first scientists to discover and classify members of the genus; his discovery of Phacus longicauda (Ehrenberg) was one of the first species of the genus to be discovered (1830) and was used as the holotype species when describing the genus. Ehrenberg, Hubner, Dujardin, and Klebs were some of the earliest researchers of Phacus, but they all had different diagnostic criteria when classifying these organisms. Originally, Ehrenberg tried to classify three species he discovered as Euglena because of their color, but ultimately were moved to the genus Phacus by Dujardin due to the similarity they exhibited in other more prominent morphological characteristics such as shape and strip arrangement.

Since the establishment of the genus, there has been difficulty in classifying organisms due to morphology because many species of Phacus have physiological traits that closely resemble other related genera. Even the most minor difference in certain physiological properties caused great confusion in determining the proper classification for many species. This occurred more prominently during the time of Dujardin because the methodology and technology used at the time in studying these organisms were far more simplistic compared to today, leading to greater difficulty in determining critical differences between organisms. Since its inception, Phacus has undergone constant reclassification and considerable re-evaluation of different taxa in accordance with new morphological and molecular information.

Habitat and ecology 
Phacus are commonly found in freshwater habitats all over the world. Many species of this genus have been discovered in several countries, including Japan, the United States, Portugal, Brazil, Korea and the Philippines. Different members of the genus have been found in temperatures ranging from 11.4 to 21.6 °C, and a pH between 6.2 and 7.5. Phacus organisms are found in a range of freshwater environments (some more acidic or alkaline than others), prefer cooler temperatures, and on average exist in more neutral pH aquatic habitats. Many species of Phacus are considered to be euplanktonic (free-floating organisms or open water plankton) because they are commonly found together with other genera of Euglenophyta. These species include members of the genera Lepocinclis, Trachelomonas, Euglena, and many different kinds of algae, which are typically found in similar aquatic habitats. The planktonic environments Phacus are generally found include swamps, ditches, trenches, ponds and even in many rice fields throughout North America and around the world. They are a small part of phytoplankton communities, but do serve important purposes such as nutrient cycling and food web stability. Their keen ability to colonize in huge numbers makes them able to survive and thrive in areas where certain algae cannot. However, Phacus are not common inhabitants of stagnant environments because those areas often do not have proper organic composition.

Being in an organically enriched freshwater environment is essential for the development of these species. Different studies have shown that the addition or removal of certain organic elements can have profound effects on cell development. In studies using beef extract to increase organic content of certain cultures, some species of Phacus were observed to have clear morphological changes different from the controls. These changes include: increasing thickness of the cell, increase in paramylon bodies (both in size and number in Phacus curvicauda), and the overall structure of the cells. Regardless of a large or small change in organic enrichment, studies show a consistency to these morphological changes. However, the amount of change that occurs varies between species and is dependent on the specific organic nutrients present. If the amount of organic nutrients in the genus’ habitat is insufficient, occasionally they form resting cysts. If this occurs, the cells would expand (swell) and become more rounded, and also lose their flagella. This increase in size forces the cell to increase the number of paramylon storage granules and develop a polysaccharide mucilaginous wall for protection until it enters a more habitable environment. In addition, cell division continues to take place even as a reproductive cyst.

Feeding 
Phacus are photosynthetic unicellular organisms, meaning that they are capable of producing their own food. Although the genus primarily receives their nutrients through photosynthesis, they are also capable of feeding on certain kinds of alga and bacteria using a feeding apparatus located on their underside. Many species of Phacus are known to be prey for a variety of marine and freshwater genera. The best known predators of the genus are planktonic Crustaceans, such as species of Diaptomus, Tropocyclops, Epischura, Daphnia, Diaphanosoma, and Holopedium.

Description

Morphology 
Phacus consists of organisms that are microscopic photosynthetic Euglenoids, which are a group of single celled, chloroplast-containing autotrophs within the phylum Euglenozoa, though the majority of genera within the phylum actually do not contain chloroplasts and are colourless. Generally these species are small, free swimming and exhibit a vibrant green colour. What sets the genus apart from other photosynthetic species is the presence of its rigid cytoskeleton (although some species have semi-rigid or plastic cytoskeleton) made up of pellicular strips and its predominantly flat, leaf-shaped structure. Many different species express secondary fusion of these pellicular strips and many of the strips have a variety of shapes including S-shaped, A-shaped, M-shaped or plateau.

The pellicles forms a shell around the cytoskeleton covering the whole cell and fuses together around the microtubule reinforced-pocket (MTR). This pocket acts as a sort of cytostome or ingestion organelle, allowing the organism to feed when bacteria enter inside. The microtubules are arranged in a peculiar doublet and triplet pattern in the upper canal. In certain species of Phacus, the MTR is a microtubule organizing center and is connected to a reservoir membrane by a striated fiber. Many species also possess an elongated caudal process with extended pellicle strips. Throughout the cytoplasm of the cell, chloroplasts are spread out fairly evenly and in high numbers. They are typically discoid and are regularly disposed of and replaced. Chloroplasts that are present in large numbers are typically smaller, are without pyrenoids and species containing fewer chloroplasts tend to have much larger ones. Phacus, like all photosynthetic Euglenoids, obtained their plastids through secondary endosymbiosis, where the ancestral phagocytic Euglenoid engulfed a green alga, and the resulting organism became the plastid.

Most of these organisms also possess a semi-rectangular eyespot, often reddish in color, and a single flagellum, although some species have two, which emerges anteriorly. The flagellum is responsible for cell movement by gyrating in the direction of travel allowing the cell to glide and swim in the water. Furthermore, some flagella vary in length from short all the way to the length of the cell in other species. Although many members of the genus have two flagella, only one is ever used for movement. The other one is usually too short and does not exit the invagination of the posterior area known as the flagellar pocket. They are located within a posterior structure called the flagellar apparatus, also known as the basal body complex.

Aside from the flagella, the flagellar apparatus also contains two basal bodies connected by a striated fiber, three asymmetric microtubular roots, and other connective fibers. The genus only has one large anisotropic body unlike many other Euglenid genera, which commonly have two. This anisotropic body is referred to as paramylon and functions as a storage substance. The paramylon is a carbohydrate energy store reserve and it is quite different from other algal carbohydrate stores due to the high amounts of crystallization present. The nucleus of the cell is generally positioned towards the middle of the cell and is adjacent to the paramylon reserve. Within the nucleus are permanently condensed chromosomes, which can easily be viewed under a light microscope. Just like other Euglenids, several species of Phacus also possess many contractile vacuoles and have a red-pigmented eyespot.

Differences in morphology 
Although the general morphology of the genus is considered to be well established, given the large number of species there are critical morphological differences observed worth noting. The sulcus for example, in many species is shallow (Phacus viridioryza), and in others it is deep and longitudinal (Phacus hordeiformis). As well, the shape of the cell in some species are completely flat, while many have also been described as helically twisted, straight or curved. Phacus helikoides is actually helical in shape throughout the entire cell as opposed to flat and leaf-shaped like most Phacus organisms.

Metaboly, which is the ability of some organisms to alter their shape, is not possible in Phacus due to the fusion of the genus’ pellicular strips. These varied morphological shapes make defining the genus as symmetrical or asymmetrical rather difficult. Scientists who study the genus Phacus Dujardin, have also observed the presence of ellipsoid, tiny disk-shaped or flat-shaped paramylon grains. In some species of Phacus, a single plate dominates the interiors of the cell (Phacus Orbicularis), and in others there are multiple plates with different morphologies that exist (Phacus Curvicauda).

Other differences among species include: the presence or lack of haplopyrenoids within the chloroplasts, position of the nucleus, a large or small endosome, shape of the cytoskeleton, few to several paramylon discoid grains, the presence of lateral caps and presence of oblique truncated poles. In addition, the morphology of the caudal process in many species of Phacus is extremely varied. Phacus parvullis and Phacus pusillus have very a blunt caudal process while Phacus segretti and Phacus stokesii actually lack a caudal process entirely. Those species are described as having rounded posteriors in place of the caudal process. Studies show that morphological changes observed in the genus are possibly due to the level of organic enrichment in their freshwater habitats. These morphological differences, given the massive size of the genus, have led to certain confusion in Phacus taxonomy.

Life cycle 
Phacus and other Euglenids typically reproduce asexually. They do so by dividing their cells longitudinally, from the apex of the cell to the base. Until cytokinesis is fully complete, the cells remain attached to one another, forming what looks like a “two-headed” organism. Prior to cytokinesis, the amount of pellicle strips each cell has is doubled in order to have an equal number between each daughter cell. In addition, each daughter cell will contain half the number of the newly formed strips and half the number of the old strips present prior to cell division.

Phylogeny 
Phacus is a member of the family Euglenaceae, the order Euglenales, class Euglenoidea, and finally the phylum Euglenozoa. Certain ancestral information regarding Phacus has been debated. Many studies looked at the genes of its many species by examining small subunit rRNA (SSU) sequences and arranging certain species into clades. What those scientists were trying to determine is what the phylogenetic tree of Phacus looks like based on molecular factors. Certain molecular phylogenetic analyses have described Phacus as being monophyletic depending on the clade studied, but the general consensus through multiple repeated analyses is that the genus is polyphyletic. This possible discrepancy has caused certain scientists to suggest possibly redefining this genus as two separate genera. In accordance with that, it is believed that Phacus divided early on in the history of photosynthetic Euglenids.

Genetics 
A major genetic change in the genus occurred in its chloroplast genome throughout its evolution. This resulted in a genome reduction - possibly due to gene loss or transfer to the nucleus, an increase in the number of introns, and large genomic rearrangements.

Evolution 
The literature mentioned above have also looked into the evolutionary history of the genus’ morphology. It is believed that the rigidity of the cells has evolved numerous times, and that was determined by comparing the semi-rigid pellicles of ancestral species with the rigid pellicles of their descendants. Another feature believed to have evolved, are the longitudinal strips that appear on most species. It appears that the number of those strips has either increased or decreased over time depending on certain species and that their arrangement (either helical or longitudinal) has also changed throughout evolution. Furthermore, it has been argued that certain behavioral and locomotor traits which previously existed for predatory feeding have no longer been selected. This seemed to have had an effect on the number of strips species of Phacus generally have. The changing numbers of strips and the clustered patterns associated are not actually adaptive themselves, but may have evolved due to the cell becoming more flat and more rigid over time. Those traits are believed to have evolved in order to adapt to a more planktonic lifestyle.

Fossil history 
The fossil record for Phacus, like most Euglenophyta, is very scarce, and little information is actually known of their geographical origins. However, there have been reports that Phacus-like microfossils have been discovered from pyriform cells, which seem to closely resemble that of Phacus or another closely related genus, Lepocinclis. These fossils, although not certain to belong to the genus, are estimated to be over 60 million years old.

Practical importance 
The presence of Phacus in certain bodies of water can actually indicate the level of organic pollution of the water. It has been observed that if a large number of Phacus organisms are present, that is indicative of high organic pollution. This particular trait allows scientists to determine the health of different bodies of water.

References

Further reading
 
 
 
 
 
 Phacus. (n.d.). Retrieved from http://eol.org/pages/11710/overview
 Pritchard, A., et al. 1861: A history of Infusoria, including the Desmidiaceae and Diatomaceae, British and foreign. London: Whitaker and co.

Euglenozoa genera